Amauri (born 1980), Amauri Carvalho de Oliveira, is an Italian football striker

Amauri may also refer to:

 Amauri d'Acigné (died 1477), French Roman Catholic prelate
 Amauri (footballer, born 1942), Amauri Alvès Horta, Brazilian football forward
 Amauri Ribeiro (born 1959), Brazilian volleyball player
 Amauri Torezan (born 1972), Brazilian abstract artist
 Amauri Sanit (born 1979), Cuban baseball player
 Amauri (footballer, born 1982), Amauri Morais Pereira, Brazilian football forward
 Amauri Hardy (born 1998), American basketball player

See also
 Amaury (disambiguation)
 Amauris, genus of butterflies